Guy Burnet (born 8 August 1983) is a British theatre, film and television actor.

Early life
Burnet was born in London, England. He attended Holland Park School where his interest in drama first developed, taking an A level in the subject.

Before becoming an actor, Burnet aspired to become a professional footballer. He attended Queens Park Rangers Football School. He subsequently undertook trials and played in various locations throughout Europe before returning to London to complete his A levels.

He still plays football, taking part in a football match on 1 June 2007 at the new Wembley Stadium prior to England's first match at the stadium. In September 2007 he played for England in an England v Russia charity match in support of the Give Life Foundation.

Acting career
Burnet started his career in theatre and making short films.  He trained with acting coach Ivana Chubbuck.

Early television roles

Burnet joined the cast of Hollyoaks in 2002 as a main character and series regular following his second ever audition. On 3 August 2007 Hollyoaks Producer Bryan Kirkwood confirmed on Digital Spy that Burnet was quitting Hollyoaks. He said, "I am genuinely gutted that Guy is leaving the show, but after five years he feels the time is right. He's an amazing actor and has really come into his own through his work on the Craig and John Paul storyline - and has helped turn it into one of Hollyoaks' biggest ever storylines. We've left the door open for him to return and I wish him the very best of luck for whatever he does next."

Later television roles
In 2009, Burnet played "Pinklady" in Moving On for the BBC. After years on the New York stage Burnet moved on to cable TV work and film. He appeared on Showtime series Ray Donovan.

In 2016, Burnet joined the third series of Showtime's The Affair in the recurring role of Mike Cornwell. In 2017, he joined the second season of Hand of God starring Ron Perlman. Also in 2017, Burnet was shooting Counterpart opposite J.K. Simmons.

He was seen in the Bryan Cranston produced Amazon series Philip K. Dick's Electric Dreams opposite Terrance Howard and Anna Paquin.

Film
In 2012, Burnet completed work as a lead in the feature film Two Jacks alongside Sienna Miller.  Other roles include work in Boxing Day, a Leo Tolstoy adaptation directed by Bernard Rose, in the thriller Rites of Passage with Christian Slater and Stephen Dorff, and in Age of Heroes a period war film with Sean Bean.

Burnet then went on to play Ewan McGregor's partner in crime caper Mortdecai opposite Johnny Depp. Burnet co-starred in the musical comedy film Pitch Perfect 3, opposite Anna Kendrick.

Burnet is cast in Jacob’s Ladder, the remake of the 1990 film of the same name. Burnet will also appear in the Michael Caton-Jones directed Asher.

Theatre
During 2012 Burnet was the lead in a production of 'Murder in the First', which played off-Broadway.

Other
As well as playing football, Burnet is involved in amateur boxing.  His interest in boxing led him to direct a documentary on WBU featherweight title holder Derry Mathews.

Filmography

Film

Television

References

External links
Official website

English male film actors
English male television actors
English male stage actors
Male actors from London
Living people
1983 births
People educated at Holland Park School